Vetka District, Vietka District or Vietka Rajon, Vietkaŭski Rajon is a district of Gomel Region, in Belarus.

Culture 
 Vojnič-Sienažecki Palace and Park Complex
 Vetka Museum of Old Believers and Belarusian Traditions

External links 

 Administration site
 Photos on Radzima.org

Districts of Gomel Region